Madison is a city in Madison and St. Clair counties in the U.S. state of Illinois. The population was 3,171 at the 2020 census, down from 3,891 in 2010. It is home to World Wide Technology Raceway at Gateway and the first Bulgarian Orthodox church in the United States.

History
Madison was founded in 1820. There have been three villages named Madison.

Geography
Madison is located in southwestern Madison County at  (38.683700, -90.151047). The central city area is bordered by Granite City to the north and Venice to the southwest. The Mississippi River forms the western boundary of Madison north of Venice, with St. Louis, Missouri, across the river.

Illinois Route 203 passes through the center of Madison as MC Cambridge Avenue and Edwardsville Road, leading north into Granite City and south to Interstates 55 and 70 at their Exit 4 in the southernmost part of town. Illinois Route 3 (Cedar Street) crosses the western part of Madison, leading south into Venice before crossing the Mississippi into St. Louis, and north through Granite City to Hartford.

Demographics

At the 2000 census there were 4,545 people, 1,881 households, and 1,117 families living in the city. The racial makup of the city was 55.36% White, 42.13% African American, 0.29% Native American, 0.11% Asian, 0.02% Pacific Islander, 0.92% from other races, and 1.17% from two or more races. Hispanic or Latino of any race were 1.96%.

Of the 1,881 households 29.8% had children under the age of 18 living with them, 31.2% were married couples living together, 22.0% had a female householder with no husband present, and 40.6% were non-families. 34.9% of households were one person and 14.7% were one person aged 65 or older. The average household size was 2.42 and the average family size was 3.13.

In the city, the age distribution of the population shows 29.8% under the age of 18, 8.6% from 18 to 24, 26.8% from 25 to 44, 19.2% from 45 to 64, and 15.5% 65 or older. The median age was 34 years. For every 100 females, there were 96.0 males. For every 100 females age 18 and over, there were 88.4 males.

The median household income was $24,828 and the median family income  was $29,926. Males had a median income of $27,363 versus $21,250 for females. The per capita income for the city was $13,090. About 19.6% of families and 24.0% of the population were below the poverty line, including 35.4% of those under age 18 and 12.0% of those age 65 or over.

National Register of Historic Places

Chain of Rocks Bridge over the Mississippi River

Transportation
Amtrak's Texas Eagle as well as its Lincoln Service pass through Madison, but don't stop in the small city. A regional bus service is provided for the community.

Notable people

 George Becker, president of United Steelworkers 1993-2001
 Donnie Freeman, basketball player at Illinois and in ABA and NBA
 Sam Harshany, catcher for the St. Louis Browns

References

External links
 
 

Cities in Illinois
Cities in Madison County, Illinois
Madison
Illinois populated places on the Mississippi River
Populated places established in 1820
1820 establishments in Illinois